The Banai is a sub-tribe of the Koches, a tribe of India. The Banai first finds mention in the census report of 1891, which states about the sub-communities of the Koches as follows : (of the Koch Garo Hills)Six sections are recorded namely Harigaya, Satparia, Dasgaya or Banai, Chapra, Wanang, Tintekiya which rank in order in which named. The first five are said to be named after the places where they formerly resided, and the last, or Tintekiya, from the dress of the women, who wear one cloth round the waist, another over the body and the third on the head.

The term "Dasgaya" actually refers to the areas on the southern tract of Garo Hills of Meghalaya and includes the villages Batabari, Kapasipara, Gasuapara, Jatrakona, Makkabaripara (etc.), which had been inhabited by the Banai since ancient times. These areas are still referred to as Daskaniya or Dasgaya by the oldest living people of the area.

Eminent linguist G.A. Grierson noted the six sections of the Koches of Garo Hills as being: Harigaya, Satparia, Dasgaya or Banai, Chapra, Wanang and Tintekiya. He believed them to be only pure Koches in existence.

B.C. Allen recorded three divisions of the Koches of Garo Hills, being Dasgaya, Harigaya and Anang.

The Anthropological Survey of India survey of the state of Meghalaya included the "Banai" as a sub-tribe of Koches of Meghalaya.

S.N. Koch, who championed the cause of the Koches for their inclusion in the Scheduled Tribe list of Meghalaya states about the divisions of the Koches as follows. The groups or divisions of the Koches of Garo Hills as found now are Wanang, Harigaya or Sanga, Satparia, Chapra or Dasgaya or Margan, Tintikiya, Banai and Sankar Koch.

The Clans 
The Banais refer to their clans as "Nikini" just like the Koches do. The list of Banai clans is as follows:

Ampabni
Dewa
Banai
Dasu
Dusa
Dhiru
Wanang
Bel
Dao
Ditla
Bakla
Dankhin
Balihata
Chapra
Chandigaia
Sati
Hari
Noksi
Tong
Nakola
Kendlai
Kamoli
Lamuk
Langka
Raba
Pakhra
Simsang
Manda
Luga
Danggo
Moah
Thekao
Chamru
Kangkala
Kangklai
Lebera
Lalung
Hasang
Khagra
Khenda-gaia
Maji
Miri
Chulta
Pachwa
Gasa-Musi
Pira

The Banai clans as cited above are matrilineal and strictly exogamous, similar to the Koch clans. In view of the existence of such clans, A. Basu remarked, "It is significant that the Banai have a clan organization in which descent is traced through the mother."

References

Indian castes